National Institute for Policy and Strategic Studies (NIPSS) in Kuru, Nigeria is a policy formation center for bureaucrats, private sector leaders, Army officers, and medium-rank and senior civil servants, which was founded in 1979. Most policymakers in Nigeria have attended the NIPSS. Its first Director General was Major General Ogundeko. The current Director General is Professor Tijjanii Muhammad-Bande (OFR). Notable graduates of the NIPSS are General Ibrahim Babangida the former Nigerian Head of State, and Comrade Ajayi Olusegun, the former Director General of Nigeria Policy Study and Mallam Nuhu Ribadu, the anti-corruption campaigner.

Alumni

Some notable alumni:
Afakriya Gadzama, former Director General State Security Service
Ibrahim Babangida, former Nigerian Head of State
Ita Ekpeyong, former Director General State Security Service
Lawal Musa Daura, acting Director General State Security Service
Nuhu Ribadu, Pioneer Chairman, Economic and Financial Crimes Commission 
Tunji Olurin, former military governor of Oyo State
Victor Malu, former Chief of Army Staff
Mohammed Badaru Abubakar, Executive Governor of Jigawa State.
Mohammed Dikko Abubakar, former Inspector General of Police (Nigeria) IGP
Aminu Adisa Logun, Kwara State Chief of staff.

Porbeni Festus Bikepre. RTD Admiral in the Nigerian Navy.
Emmanuel Osarunwese Ugowe, Former AIG of Police. Monitor General 1982
Onuzulike Daniel Okonkwo, former Director, Federal Ministry of Communications

References
Notes

Education in Nigeria
Organizations established in 1979